Ásdís Hjálmsdóttir (born 28 October 1985) is an Icelandic former javelin thrower.

Biography
She represented her country at both 2008, 2012, and 2016 Olympic Games and has also competed at the 2006, 2010, 2012, 2014, 2016 European Championships and 2009, 2011, 2013, 2015 and 2017 World Championships.

Her personal best is 63.43 metres, achieved on 12 July 2017 in Joensuu, Finland. She is the current Icelandic record holder.

Competition record

Personal life
In end of 2020, Ásdís was infected with COVID-19 and was hospitalised for a week where she was put on a ventilator.

References

External links 
 
 
 

1985 births
Living people
Asdis Hjalmsdottir
Athletes (track and field) at the 2008 Summer Olympics
Athletes (track and field) at the 2012 Summer Olympics
Athletes (track and field) at the 2016 Summer Olympics
Asdis Hjalmsdottir
Asdis Hjalmsdottir
Asdis Hjalmsdottir
Swedish Athletics Championships winners
Icelandic Athletics Championships winners